The 2023 Australian Swimming Championships are scheduled to be held from 17 to 20 April 2023 at the Gold Coast Aquatic Centre in Gold Coast, Queensland.

Schedule

M = Morning session, E = Evening session

Medal winners
The medallist for the open events are below.

Men's events

Men's multi-class events

Women's events

Women's multi-class events

Mixed events

References

Swimming Championships
Australian championships
Australian Swimming Championships
Sports competitions on the Gold Coast, Queensland
Australian Swimming Championships